Vestec is a municipality and village in Náchod District in the Hradec Králové Region of the Czech Republic. It has about 200 inhabitants.

Administrative parts
Villages of Hostinka and Větrník are administrative parts of Vestec.

Notable people
Arnošt of Pardubice (1297–1364), Archbishop of Prague

References

Villages in Náchod District